Mardi Gras refers to events of the Carnival celebration, beginning on or after the Christian feasts of the Epiphany (Three Kings Day) and culminating on the day before Ash Wednesday, which is known as Shrove Tuesday.  is French for "Fat Tuesday", reflecting the practice of the last night of eating rich, fatty foods before the ritual Lenten sacrifices and fasting of the Lenten season.

Related popular practices are associated with Shrovetide celebrations before the fasting and religious obligations associated with the penitential season of Lent. In countries such as the United Kingdom, Mardi Gras is more usually known as Pancake Day or (traditionally) Shrove Tuesday, derived from the word shrive, meaning "to administer the sacrament of confession to; to absolve".

Traditions
The festival season varies from city to city, as some traditions, such as the one in New Orleans, Louisiana, consider Mardi Gras to stretch the entire period from Twelfth Night (the last night of Christmas which begins Epiphany) to Ash Wednesday.  Others treat the final three-day period before Ash Wednesday as the Mardi Gras. 

In Mobile, Alabama, Mardi Gras–associated social events begin in November, followed by mystic society balls on Thanksgiving, then New Year's Eve, followed by parades and balls in January and February, celebrating up to midnight before Ash Wednesday. In earlier times, parades were held on New Year's Day. Carnival is an important celebration in Anglican and Catholic European nations.

Belgium

The three-day Carnival of Binche, near Mons, is one of the best known in Belgium. It takes place around Shrove Tuesday (or Mardi Gras) just before Lent. Performers known as Gilles wear elaborate costumes in the national colours of red, black and yellow. During the parade, they throw oranges at the crowd. In 2003, it was recognized by UNESCO as one of the Masterpieces of the Oral and Intangible Heritage of Humanity.

Czech Republic
In the Czech Republic, it is a folk tradition to celebrate Mardi Gras, which is called Masopust (meat-fast, i.e. beginning of the fast there). There are celebrations in many places including Prague, but the tradition also prevails in villages such as Staré Hamry, whose door-to-door processions made it to the UNESCO World Intangible Cultural Heritage List.

Germany

The celebration on the same day in Germany knows many different terms, such as Schmutziger Donnerstag or Fetter Donnerstag (Fat Thursday), Unsinniger Donnerstag, Weiberfastnacht, Greesentag and others, and are often only one part of the whole carnival events during one or even two weeks before Ash Wednesday be called Karneval, Fasching, or Fastnacht among others, depending on the region. In standard German, schmutzig means "dirty", but in the Alemannic dialects schmotzig means "lard" (Schmalz), or "fat"; "Greasy Thursday", as remaining winter stores of lard and butter used to be consumed at that time, before the fasting began. Fastnacht means "Eve of the Fast", but all three terms cover the whole carnival season. The traditional start of the carnival season is on 11 November at 11:11 am (11/11 11:11).

Italy
In Italy Mardi Gras is called Martedì Grasso (Fat Tuesday).  It is the main day of Carnival along with the Thursday before, called Giovedí Grasso (Fat Thursday), which ratifies the start of the celebrations. The most famous Carnivals in northern Italy are in Venice, Viareggio and Ivrea, while in the southern part of Italy the Sardinian Sartiglia and the intriguing apotropaic masks, especially the mamuthones, issohadores, s'urtzu (and so on), are more popular, belonging to a very ancient tradition. Ivrea has the characteristic "Battle of Oranges" that finds its roots in medieval times.  The Italian version of the festival is spelled Carnevale.

Sweden
In Sweden the celebration is called Fettisdagen, when fastlagsbulle is eaten, more commonly called Semla. The name comes from the words "fett" (fat) and "tisdag" (Tuesday). Originally, this was the only day one should eat fastlagsbullar.

United States

While not observed nationally throughout the United States, a number of historically ethnically French cities and regions in the country have notable celebrations. Mardi Gras arrived in North America as a French Catholic tradition with the Le Moyne brothers, Pierre Le Moyne d'Iberville and Jean-Baptiste Le Moyne de Bienville, in the late 17th century, when King Louis XIV sent the pair to defend France's claim on the territory of Louisiane, which included what are now the U.S. states of Alabama, Mississippi, Louisiana and part of eastern Texas.

The expedition, led by Iberville, entered the mouth of the Mississippi River on the evening of 2 March 1699 (new style), Lundi Gras. They did not yet know it was the river explored and claimed for France by René-Robert Cavelier, Sieur de La Salle in 1683. The party proceeded upstream to a place on the east bank about  downriver from where New Orleans is today, and made camp. This was on 3 March 1699, Mardi Gras, so in honour of this holiday, Iberville named the spot Point du Mardi Gras (French: "Mardi Gras Point") and called the nearby tributary Bayou Mardi Gras. 

Bienville went on to found the settlement of Mobile, Alabama in 1702 as the first capital of French Louisiana. In 1703 French settlers in Mobile established the first organised Mardi Gras celebration tradition in what was to become the United States. The first informal mystic society, or krewe, was formed in Mobile in 1711, the Boeuf Gras Society. By 1720, Biloxi had been made capital of Louisiana. The French Mardi Gras customs had accompanied the colonists who settled there.

In 1723, the capital of Louisiana was moved to New Orleans, founded in 1718.  The first Mardi Gras parade held in New Orleans is recorded to have taken place in 1837. The tradition in New Orleans expanded to the point that it became synonymous with the city in popular perception, and embraced by residents of New Orleans beyond those of French or Catholic heritage. Mardi Gras celebrations are part of the basis of the slogan Laissez les bons temps rouler ("Let the good times roll"). 

The parades of the largest krewes (colloquially known as "super krewes") traditionally occur immediately prior to and on Shrove Tuesday, including those of Endymion (Saturday, which also culminates with a concert event at Caesars Superdome), Bacchus (Sunday), and Zulu and Rex (Tuesday). In the evening, balls are held by the Rex and Comus krewes; the traditional visit of the King and Queen of Mardi Gras to the Comus ball ("the Meeting of the Courts") serves as the symbolic end of the festivities.

Other cities along the Gulf Coast with early French colonial heritage, from Pensacola, Florida; Galveston, Texas; to Lake Charles and Lafayette, Louisiana; and north to Natchez, Mississippi and Alexandria, Louisiana, have active Mardi Gras celebrations.

Galveston's first recorded Mardi Gras celebration, in 1867, included a masked ball at Turner Hall (Sealy at 21st St.) and a theatrical performance from Shakespeare's "King Henry IV" featuring Alvan Reed (a justice of the peace weighing in at 350 pounds) as Falstaff. The first year that Mardi Gras was celebrated on a grand scale in Galveston was 1871 with the emergence of two rival Mardi Gras societies, or "Krewes" called the Knights of Momus (known only by the initials "K.O.M.") and the Knights of Myth, both of which devised night parades, masked balls, exquisite costumes and elaborate invitations. The Knights of Momus, led by some prominent Galvestonians, decorated horse-drawn wagons for a torch lit night parade. Boasting such themes as "The Crusades," "Peter the Great," and "Ancient France," the procession through downtown Galveston culminated at Turner Hall with a presentation of tableaux and a grand gala.

In the rural Acadiana area, many Cajuns celebrate with the Courir de Mardi Gras, a tradition that dates to medieval celebrations in France.

St. Louis, Missouri, founded in 1764 by French fur traders, claims to host the second largest Mardi Gras celebration in the United States. The celebration is held in the historic French neighborhood, Soulard, and attracts hundreds of thousands of people from around the country. Although founded in the 1760s, the St. Louis Mardi Gras festivities only date to the 1980s. The city's celebration begins with "12th night," held on Epiphany, and ends on Fat Tuesday. The season is peppered with various parades celebrating the city's rich French Catholic heritage.

Costumes

Mardi Gras, as a celebration of life before the more-somber occasion of Ash Wednesday, nearly always involves the use of masks and costumes by its participants, and the most popular celebratory colors are purple, green, and gold.  In New Orleans, for example, these often take the shape of fairies, animals, people from myths, or various Medieval costumes  as well as clowns and Indians (Native Americans).  

Many costumes today are simply elaborate creations of colored feathers and capes. Unlike Halloween costumery, Mardi Gras costumes are not usually associated with such things as zombies, mummies, bats, blood, and the like, though death may be a theme in some. The Venice tradition has brought golden masks into the usual round of costumes.

Exposure by women 

Women exposing their breasts during Mardi Gras in New Orleans, US, has been documented since 1889, when the Times-Democrat decried the "degree of immodesty exhibited by nearly all female masqueraders seen on the streets." The practice was mostly limited to tourists in the upper Bourbon Street area. In the crowded streets of the French Quarter, generally avoided by locals on Mardi Gras Day, flashers on balconies cause crowds to form on the streets.

In the last decades of the 20th century, the rise in producing commercial videotapes catering to voyeurs helped encourage a tradition of women baring their breasts in exchange for beads and trinkets.  Social scientists studying "ritual disrobement" found, at Mardi Gras 1991, 1,200 instances of body-baring in exchange for beads or other favors.

See also
 Carnaval de Ponce
 Fantasy Fest
 Fat Thursday, a similar traditional Christian feast associated with the celebration of Carnival.
 Maslenitsa
 Shrove Tuesday
 Sydney Gay and Lesbian Mardi Gras
 Tsiknopempti
 Užgavėnės

References

External links

 Traditional Cajun Mardi Gras Celebrations
 Mardi Gras in Mobile, Encyclopedia of Alabama
 Where to Celebrate Mardi Gras Around the World – slideshow by The Guardian
 Fashion plates featuring historic Mardi Gras costumes from the Metropolitan Museum of Art Libraries

 
Tuesday observances
February observances
March observances
Holidays based on the date of Easter
Catholic Church in the United States
Clothing-optional events